The 2019 Busan Open was a professional tennis tournament played on hard courts. It was the eighteenth edition of the tournament which was part of the 2019 ATP Challenger Tour. It took place in Busan, South Korea between 6 and 12 May 2019.

Singles main-draw entrants

Seeds
* 1 Rankings as of 29 April 2019.

Other entrants
The following players received wildcards into the singles main draw:
  Hong Seong-chan
  Kim Cheong-eui
  Kim Young-seok
  Nam Ji-sung
  Song Min-kyu

The following players received entry from the qualifying draw:
  Makoto Ochi
  Xia Zihao

Champions

Singles

 Ričardas Berankis def.  Andrew Harris 7–6(7–5), 6–2.

Doubles

 Hsieh Cheng-peng /  Christopher Rungkat def.  Toshihide Matsui /  Vishnu Vardhan 7–6(9–7), 6–1.

References

External links
Official Website

2019 ATP Challenger Tour
2019
2019 in South Korean tennis
May 2019 sports events in South Korea